Sengers syndrome is a rare autosomal recessive condition characterised by congenital cataract, hypertrophic cardiomyopathy, muscle weakness and lactic acidosis after exercise. In some cases, they are inherited, in which case they would be called congenital.  In addition, heart disease and muscle disease are prevalent, and life expectancy is short for many patients.

Types
There are two forms of the disease: 

1. The lethal neonatal form. Hypertrophic cardiomyopathy is diagnosed at birth in half. Death in the first year is usually due to cardiac failure. Marked lactic acidemia occurs with even limited muscular exertion.

2.The chronic form, which has stable cardiomyopathy and myopathy with normal intellect. Other reported features include nystagmus, strabismus, hypotonia, hyporeflexia and delayed motor development.

Signs and symptoms
Cataracts often develop shortly after birth or at the time of birth.  It may be necessary to have early surgery if they are dense enough to impair vision.  Despite this, visual rehabilitation is less than ideal since vision is rarely normal and many children attend special schools for the blind.

Additionally, skeletal muscles and the heart become weak because of this disorder.  Common symptoms include fatigue, muscle weakness, and floppiness (hypotonia).  It is often seen following exercise that you develop lactic acidosis, which is a medical condition that requires prompt treatment.  A thickened heart muscle impairs its pumping ability (hypertrophic cardiomyopathy).  The generalized muscle weakness can cause motor development to be delayed, despite normal intelligence.

Genetics
A variety of specialists can make the diagnosis, including ophthalmologists, neurologists, cardiologists, and pediatricians.  Due to the widespread impact of the disease, it is most likely a team effort.  Both heart disease and metabolic lactic acidosis are life-threatening and must be treated promptly.  Nevertheless, many infants die during the neonatal period, while others may live for decades.  It is important to note that this condition has a wide range of severity. This disease is caused by mutations in AGK or SLC25A4 genes. The AGK gene encodes the mitochondrial acylglycerol kinase which plays a role in the assembly of adenine nucleotide translocator. The SLC25A4 gene encodes the heart and muscle-specific isoform 1 of the mitochondrial adenine nucleotide translocator.

Diagnosis
The diagnosis may be provisionally made on clinical grounds. Ophthalmologists, neurologists, cardiologists, and pediatricians are some of the specialists who can make the diagnosis.  Because of the widespread impact of the disease, it is most likely to be a collaborative effort.  Acute lactic acidosis and heart disease are the greatest threats to life and must be treated promptly.  Yet, more than half of newborns die before they reach their second birthday, and some live a decade or more.  In terms of severity, there is a considerable range. Further diagnostic tests include serum and urine analysis for lactic acid, a chest X-ray (or cardiac CT or MRI) and echocardiography. Biopsies from cardiac and skeletal muscle will show the presence of lipid and glycogen. testing for mitochondrial abnormalities, ANT deficiency, and decreases of respiratory chain complexes I and IV can also be done.

Differential diagnosis
 Isolated ATP synthase deficiency
 Barth syndrome
 TMEM70 deficiency

Treatment
Surgery for cataracts may be needed. Medical treatment for cardiac failure will be required. Treatment is otherwise supportive.

Prognosis
About half the patients die within the first year of life. Because of its rarity, the prognosis for the chronic form is not well established but survival into adulthood has been reported.

Epidemiology
Sengers syndrome is a rare disorder. About 40 cases have been reported worldwide.

History
This condition was first described in 1975.

References

External links 

 Autosomal recessive disorders
 Genetic diseases and disorders
 Rare syndromes